Pedro I may refer to:

Pedro I Fadrique (died in 1355)
Pedro I of Portugal (1320–1367)
Pedro of Castile (known as The Cruel) (1334–1369)
Pedro I of Kongo (ruled 1543–1545)
Pedro I of Brazil (1798–1834)

See also
Peter I (disambiguation)

pl:Piotr I